Liquid Sky is a 1982 film.

Liquid Sky may also refer to:

Liquid Sky (band), a British metal band
LiquidSky, a cloud gaming service